Flemish Brabant is a province of Flanders, one of the three regions of Belgium. It borders on (clockwise from the North) the Belgian provinces of Antwerp, Limburg, Liège, Walloon Brabant, Hainaut and East Flanders. Flemish Brabant also surrounds the Brussels-Capital Region. Its capital is Leuven. As of January 2019, Flemish Brabant has a population of 1,146,175.

Flemish Brabant was created in 1995 by the splitting of the former province of Brabant into three parts: two new provinces, Flemish Brabant and Walloon Brabant; and the Brussels-Capital Region, which no longer belongs to any province. The split was made to accommodate the eventual division of Belgium in three regions (Flanders, Wallonia and the Brussels-Capital Region).

The province is made up of two arrondissements. The Halle-Vilvoorde Arrondissement has Brussels in its middle and is therefore mainly a residential area, even though it also has large industrial zones and contains Belgium's main airport. The other arrondissement is the Leuven Arrondissement, centered on Leuven. The province's products include Belgian beers.

The official language in Flemish Brabant is Dutch (as it is in the whole of Flanders), but a few municipalities are to a certain extent allowed to use French to communicate with their citizens; these are called the municipalities with language facilities. Other such special municipalities can be found along the border between Flanders and Wallonia, and between Wallonia and the German-speaking area of Belgium. Halle-Vilvoorde mostly surrounds Brussels, which is officially bilingual but whose inhabitants mostly speak French.

Politics

The Governor is the representative or "commissioner" of the Federal and the Flemish Government in Flemish Brabant. He is appointed by the Flemish Government, on the unanimous advice of the Federal Council of Ministers. From the creation of Flemish Brabant in 1995 as a result of the division of the Province of Brabant into Flemish and French speaking provinces until his retirement in 2020, the Governor was Lodewijk De Witte. He was succeeded by Jan Spooren. 

The Governor is responsible for supervising the local authorities, ensuring that laws and decrees are observed, maintaining public order and security, and coordinating the response to a disaster which has occurred in his province. He also presides over the Deputation, however, he doesn't have the right to vote in the Deputation except in those cases where the Deputation exercises a judicial function.

Flemish Brabant is the only province that has a Deputy Governor as well. The Deputy Governor is appointed by the Flemish Government on the unanimous advice of the Federal Council of Ministers and must have a considerable knowledge of both the Dutch and the French language. He is responsible for ensuring that the language legislation is observed in the peripheral municipalities of Flemish Brabant.

The Provincial Council of Flemish Brabant consists of 72 members (84 members until 2012) elected for a term of office of 6 years. The last election was held on Sunday 14 October 2012. Seven political parties have seats in the Provincial Council:
  New Flemish Alliance (N-VA): 19 seats
  Christen-Democratisch en Vlaams (CD&V): 15 seats
  Open Flemish Liberals and Democrats (Open Vld): 13 seats
  Socialist Party – Different (sp.a): 8 seats
  Green (Groen): 7 seats
  Union of Francophones (UF): 5 seats
  Flemish Interest (Vlaams Belang): 5 seats
The current President of the Provincial Council is An Hermans (CD&V). She is assisted by a Bureau which consists of two Vice-Presidents, four Secretaries, three Quaestors and the floor leaders of the fractions in the Provincial Council.

The governing majority in the Provincial Council for 2013–2018 is formed by CD&V, Open VLD, sp.a and Groen. These parties together have a majority of 43 out of 72 seats.

The Deputation is the executive organ responsible for the daily administration of the province. It consists of the Governor and six Deputies elected by the Provincial Council from among its midst. For the 2013–2018 legislative term, the Deputies are divided among the majority parties as follows: two for CD&V, two for Open Vld, one for sp.a and one for Groen.

Economy 
The Gross domestic product (GDP) of the province was 49.8 billion € in 2018. GDP per capita adjusted for purchasing power was 38,600 € or 128% of the EU27 average in the same year.

Religion 
According to the International Social Survey Programme 2008: Religion III by the Association of Religion Data Archives,  73.9% of Flemish Brabant's population identified themselves as Catholics, 23.1% as non-religious, and 3% adhered other religions.

Municipalities
Flemish Brabant has 65 municipalities: 35 in the Arrondissement of Halle-Vilvoorde and 30 in Leuven.

See also 
 Duchy of Brabant

 Duke of Brabant

Notes

References

External links 

 Official web site of the Flemish Brabant province

 
Brabant
NUTS 2 statistical regions of the European Union
Provinces of Flanders